The following is a list of schools that participate in NCAA Division I field hockey, according to NCAA.org. In the most recently completed 2022 season, 79 Division I schools competed.

Conference affiliations are as of the most recent 2022 NCAA field hockey season. These reflect field hockey affiliations, which do not necessarily match schools' primary affiliations.

Division I programs

Notes

References

 
 
N
NCAA Division I Field Hockey Programs
Hockey, field